The House of Assembly of Barbados is the lower house of the bicameral Parliament of Barbados. It has 30 Members of Parliament (MPs), who are directly elected in single member constituencies using the simple-majority (or first-past-the-post) system for a term of five years.  The House of Assembly sits roughly 40–45 days a year and is presided over by a Speaker.

The Barbadian House of Assembly chamber is located in the east-wing of The Public Buildings on Broad Street, in Bridgetown, Barbados.

Oath of affirmation 
Under section 59 of the constitution, before entering upon the functions of his office, the MPs must take the oath of allegiance to Barbados.

Next election 

The Constitution of Barbados reads, in part:
 61(3)  "...Parliament, unless sooner dissolved, shall continue for five years from the date of its first sitting after any dissolution and shall then stand dissolved."
 62(1)  "After every dissolution of Parliament the Governor General [since 30 November 2021: President] shall issue writs for a general election of members of appointment the House of Assembly returnable within ninety days from that dissolution."

The next election is therefore due to be held in 2027, but can be held sooner if the President of Barbados so directs.

Latest elections

Previous elections 

In previous elections the National Democratic Party (NDP), the Barbados National Party (BNP), the Conservatives and Independents also won seats besides the two big parties - the Barbados Labour Party (BLP) and the Democratic Labour Party (DLP). The DLP had been in opposition since 6 September 1994. Fourteen years later when they won a surprise victory of 20 seats to 10 on 15 January 2008, DLP Leader David Thompson was sworn in as the 6th Prime Minister of Barbados. Freundel Stuart was sworn in on 23 October 2010 because of the death of Prime Minister Thompson, who had been diagnosed with pancreatic cancer in March 2010. Two months later in May he became ill when the then Acting Prime Minister Freundel Stuart had started, and five months later he was sworn in on 23 October as the 7th Prime Minister of Barbados. On 23 February 2013 he was sworn in as the 7th Prime Minister of Barbados by obtaining sixteen out of thirty seats. The general elections of 21 February were one of the closest elections Barbados has ever seen. On 24 May 2018, the BLP returned to power under Mia Mottley with a historic landslide victory that saw them win all 30 seats in parliament and Mottley becoming the 1st female Prime Minister and the 8th Prime Minister overall. This occurred once again on the 19 January 2022 when the Mottley Administration won all 30 seats again in another landslide victory.

See also 
Parliament of Barbados
Senate of Barbados
Politics of Barbados
List of legislatures by country

References

Further reading 
 Reports of General Elections and By-Elections, Electoral and Boundaries Commission (E&BC)
 About parliament - House of Assembly, Inter-Parliamentary Union

External links 

Government of Barbados
Barbados
Westminster system
1639 establishments in the British Empire
Parliament of Barbados